Carlton Jackston "Jak" Crawford (born 2 May 2005) is an American racing driver who is currently racing in the 2023 Formula 2 Championship for Hitech Grand Prix. He most recently competed in the 2022 FIA Formula 3 Championship with Prema Racing. He is a member of the Red Bull Junior Team and finished as runner-up in the 2020 ADAC Formula 4 Championship.

Career

Karting 
Born in Charlotte, North Carolina, Crawford started his karting career in 2011 after he moved to the Houston, Texas area. He competed in multiple championships, predominantly in North America, winning the Challenge of the Americas - Junior Rotax Series among others. In Crawford's first overseas karting race in 2014 at the Rok Cup International Championship, while only 9 years old, he finished second. Other international karting competition was mostly sporadic but generally successful.

Lower formulae 
In 2018, Crawford made his car racing debut in the NACAM Formula 4 Championship, driving for Scuderia Martiga EG. He won six races, and with eight further podiums the American driver finished second in the Series behind Manuel Sulaimán.

Crawford raced in the German and Italian Formula 4 Championships in 2020, however, due to the COVID-19 pandemic he would only compete part-time in the latter. He signed for Van Amersfoort Racing, partnering fellow Red Bull Junior Team member Jonny Edgar. The American driver would end up finishing second in the ADAC Formula 4 Championship with a gap of just two points behind Edgar, while in the Italian Championship he would finish sixth, despite missing two race weekends.

Road to Indy

U.S. F2000 
In April 2019, Crawford joined DEForce Racing to contest part of the 2019 season as he was not old enough to start the racing season. In July, he switched to Cape Motorsports to contest the final five rounds and ended the season seventh in the standings.

Euroformula Open 

In March 2021, it was announced Crawford would race with Motopark in the 2021 season alongside his FIA Formula 3 commitments.

Formula Regional

2022 
In January 2022, Crawford partook in the Formula Regional Asian Championship with Prema ahead of their FIA Formula 3 campaign together.

2023 
Crawford is set to partake in three rounds in the 2023 Formula Regional Middle East Championship with Hitech Grand Prix before his main 2023 campaign.

FIA Formula 3 Championship

2021 

In October 2020 Crawford completed the first post-season test at Catalunya, running for Hitech GP. Later that month, the British outfit once again fielded Crawford in the second post-season test at Jerez and confirmed him for the 2021 season in January the following year.

2022 
In November, Crawford joined Prema Racing, which had taken fellow Red Bull junior Dennis Hauger to that year's title, for the post-season test. In January 2022, Crawford was confirmed with the Italian outfit for that year's championship.

FIA Formula 2 Championship 
Crawford tested for Hitech Grand Prix in the 2022 post-season Yas Marina F2 test. On January 2023, it was announced that Crawford would be reuniting with Hitech for the 2023 Formula 2 Championship, partnering Red Bull junior Isack Hadjar.

Formula One 
In January 2020, Crawford was named as a new signing for the Red Bull Junior Team.

Karting record

Karting career summary

Complete CIK-FIA Karting European Championship results 
(key) (Races in bold indicate pole position) (Races in italics indicate fastest lap)

Racing record

Racing career summary 

* Season still in progress.

Complete NACAM Formula 4 Championship results 
(key) (Races in bold indicate pole position) (Races in italics indicate fastest lap)

Complete U.S. F2000 National Championship results

Complete ADAC Formula 4 Championship results 
(key) (Races in bold indicate pole position) (Races in italics indicate fastest lap)

Complete Italian F4 Championship results 
(key) (Races in bold indicate pole position) (Races in italics indicate fastest lap)

Complete Euroformula Open Championship results 
(key) (Races in bold indicate pole position; races in italics indicate points for the fastest lap of top ten finishers)

Complete FIA Formula 3 Championship results 
(key) (Races in bold indicate pole position; races in italics indicate fastest lap)

Complete Formula Regional Asian Championship results 
(key) (Races in bold indicate pole position) (Races in italics indicate the fastest lap of top ten finishers)

Complete Formula Regional Middle East Championship results
(key) (Races in bold indicate pole position) (Races in italics indicate fastest lap)

* Season still in progress.

Complete FIA Formula 2 Championship results 
(key) (Races in bold indicate pole position) (Races in italics indicate points for the fastest lap of top ten finishers)

References

External links 
 
 

2005 births
Living people
American racing drivers
Italian F4 Championship drivers
American people of Scotch-Irish descent
ADAC Formula 4 drivers
FIA Formula 3 Championship drivers
Racing drivers from Charlotte, North Carolina
Van Amersfoort Racing drivers
Motopark Academy drivers
Hitech Grand Prix drivers
Prema Powerteam drivers
Formula Regional Asian Championship drivers
U.S. F2000 National Championship drivers
Euroformula Open Championship drivers
NACAM F4 Championship drivers
FIA Formula 2 Championship drivers
Formula Regional Middle East Championship drivers